Fumana laevis is a species of plants in the family Cistaceae.

Sources

References 

laevis
Flora of Malta
Taxa named by Antonio José Cavanilles